Opatroides punctulatus is a species of darkling beetle in the family Tenebrionidae.

Subspecies
These two subspecies belong to the species Opatroides punctulatus:
 Opatroides punctulatus punctulatus Brulle, 1832 g
 Opatroides punctulatus subcylindricus (Menetries, 1849) g
Data sources: i = ITIS, c = Catalogue of Life, g = GBIF, b = Bugguide.net

References

Further reading

External links

 
 

Tenebrioninae
Beetles described in 1832